Lviv Academic Gymnasium at the National University "Lviv Polytechnic" - the oldest high school in Lviv, Ukraine based on the order of Joseph II, Holy Roman Emperor, on October 24, 1784.

Lviv Academic Gymnasium is considered one of the best secondary schools in Ukraine.

The building of the Gymnasium located on the street Stepan Bandera, 14 on the left of the main building of Lviv Polytechnic. Vasyl Il'nyts'ky was the first director of gymnasium.

Faculty members
 Paulin Święcicki, a Ukrainian language instructor from Kiev Governorate

References

External links
  ukr.

Education in Lviv